"You're the One" is a song recorded by Welsh singer Bonnie Tyler for her eleventh studio album, Free Spirit (1995). It was written by German songwriters Rudolf Schenker and Klaus Meine, both of whom are members of hard rock band Scorpions. The song was produced by Humberto Gatica and Simon Franglen. "You're the One" was released as a single in 1995. It spent one week in the German Top 100, reaching number ninety-nine.

Scorpions recorded a cover of the song for their 1996 album Pure Instinct.

Track listing
German CD single
"You're the One" — 3:59
"Sexual Device" — 4:00
"What You Got" — 5:32

Charts

Scorpions cover
German hard rock band Scorpions recorded the song under a different title; "Are You the One?". The song featured on their album Pure Instinct (1996).

Personnel
Klaus Meine-lead vocals
Rudolf Schenker-acoustic guitar

Additional musicians
Luke Herzog, Koen van Bael-keyboards

References

1995 singles
Bonnie Tyler songs
Rock ballads
1995 songs
Songs written by Rudolf Schenker
Songs written by Klaus Meine
East West Records singles